The Wishing Chair may refer to:

The Wishing Chair (album), 1985 album by alternative rock band 10,000 Maniacs.
The Wishing Chair (series), series of children's novels by Enid Blyton.